The Radar RD6 is an all-electric Mid-size pickup truck produced by the Chinese automaker Geely under the Radar brand. It was claimed to be built on the Sustainable Experience Architecture (SEA), despite heavily sharing the platform and parts with the Geely Haoyue SUV. Radar Auto has its own R&D facility in Hangzhou and an EV plant in Zibo, Shandong.

Overview 
The public debut of the RD6 was scheduled for the 2022 Chengdu Motor Show starting on August 26, 2022. The launch on the Chinese car market for the RD6 was on September 9.

The RD6 is available in single- and dual-motor configurations. The pure electric range could reach  based on China’s CLTC.

Payload 450kg, 3000kg towing, 1200 litre bed, 70 litre frunk. 6 kW output panel (220V outlets, two of each: 10A, 12A and 16A). V2L (vehicle to load) and V2V (vehicle to vehicle).

References

External links 

 Official website (China)

Radar RD6
Cars introduced in 2022
2020s cars
Pickup trucks
Rear-wheel-drive vehicles
All-wheel-drive vehicles
Cars of China
Production electric cars